Mark Currie is the name of:

 Mark Currie (games developer), games developer
 Mark John Currie (1795–1874), officer of the Royal Navy, explorer, and early settler in Western Australia
 Mark Currie (cricketer) (born 1979), English cricketer

See also
Mark Curry (disambiguation)